Simply is the sixth and final studio album by American country singer–songwriter K. T. Oslin. It was released on June 2, 2015 via Red River Entertainment and contained nine tracks. The project was co-produced by Oslin herself and Jimmy Nichols. Simply was Oslin's first studio release in 14 years and included a mix of re-recordings and new material. The album would also be the final release of new music in her career.

Background and content
Prior to the release of Simply, K. T. Oslin had been away from the public eye for over a decade. In 2014, she returned to performing with a live cabaret-themed show. The program included newer versions of her former hits and some new material. The success of the show led to the album's creation. Simply was recorded in sessions held at three studios: Bone-Us-Trax, Studio White House and White Rock Studios. It also recorded in the basement of her band's bass player. The sessions were co-produced by Oslin, as well as Jimmy Nichols. The project was completed in a time span of three days.

The album contained one new song ("Do You Think About Me") and eight new versions of Oslin's previously-recorded material. This included remakes of some of her biggest hits, such as "Hold Me" and "80's Ladies." In a 2015 interview, Oslin explained that she felt differently about her former hits and chose to simplify their production for these reasons. The album also included re-recordings of songs that may be lesser-known to fans, such as "Younger Men" and "New Way Home."

Critical reception

Simply received positive reviews from critics and writers following its release. Markos Papadatos of Digital Journal gave the project a 4.5 star rating in his review. He called the album's material "nostalgic" in the way that the re-recordings evoked memories of Oslin's early years. He also used words like "strong" and "crystalline" to describe her voice. Papadatos concluded by saying, "Overall, K.T. Oslin delivers on her latest comeback album Simply. Her vocals are all spot-on and remarkable. The arrangements are different, yet neat." 

In addition, Ben Foster of Country Universe gave Simply a four-star rating. "While “Do You Think About Me” is our only taste of new Oslin songwriting for now, Simply is nonetheless a worthwhile acquisition for its success in making the old feel new again," he concluded. Matt Bjorke of Roughstock also gave the release a positive response. He praised Oslin's vocal performance, commenting that she was in "fine voice" despite being 74 years old. Bjorke also praised the production of Oslin's co-producer (Jimmy Nichols) for helping create simple arrangements for the project.

Release
Simply was released on June 2, 2015 via Red River Entertainment. It was Oslin's sixth studio release in her career. It was also her first studio release on an independent record label. The album was made available as a compact disc and as a digital download. The project did not chart on any Billboard music surveys, including the Top Country Albums chart, where all of her previous studio albums charted. According to Oslin, the album was simply meant to be sold along with her live show. No additional promotion was given to the record. "We’re not trying to get back on a label or make a big splash with this. We just wanted to make a record for fans to buy at shows," she commented. Simply would mark Oslin's final album release in her career. After being diagnosed with Parkinson's disease, she would die in 2020.

Track listing

Personnel
All credits are adapted from the liner notes of Simply and Allmusic.

Musical personnel
 Mike Durham – electric guitar
 Dennis Holt – background vocals, drums
 Jimmy Nichols – background vocals, keyboards
 K. T. Oslin – lead vocals
 David Santos – background vocals, bass, guitar

Technical personnel
 Jeff Balding – mixing 
 John Gertin – assistant
 Tonya Ginnetti – production assistant
 Andrew Mendelson – mastering
 Jimmy Nichols – engineer, producer
 K. T. Oslin – producer

Release history

References

2015 albums
Albums produced by K. T. Oslin
K. T. Oslin albums